Pauline Allin (born 2 May 1995) is a French professional racing cyclist, who currently rides for UCI Women's Continental Team . Allin was a member of the  team, from 2017 to its first UCI season in 2019.

References

External links
 

1995 births
Living people
French female cyclists
People from Saintes, Charente-Maritime
Sportspeople from Charente-Maritime
Cyclists from Nouvelle-Aquitaine
21st-century French women